Hibbertia suffrutescens is a species of flowering plant in the family Dilleniaceae and is endemic to the Northern Kimberley region of Western Australia. It is a small shrub with wiry branches, narrowly lance-shaped leaves with the narrower end towards the base, and yellow flowers arranged singly along the branches, with 30 to 36 stamens arranged in groups around two densely scaly carpels.

Description

Taxonomy
Hibbertia suffrutescens was first formally described in 2010 by Hellmut R. Toelken in the Journal of the Adelaide Botanic Gardens from specimens collected near Kalumburu in 1985. The specific epithet (suffrutescens) means "slightly woody", referring to the shoots.

Distribution and habitat
This hibbertia grows in sandy soil and in sandstone crevices in woodland in the Northern Kimberley region of northern Western Australia.

Conservation status
Hibbertia suffrutescens is classified as "not threatened" by the Government of Western Australia Department of Parks and Wildlife.

See also
List of Hibbertia species

References

suffrutescens
Flora of Western Australia
Plants described in 2010
Taxa named by Hellmut R. Toelken